Nyzhniv is a village in Ivano-Frankivsk Raion (district) of the Ivano-Frankivsk Oblast (province) in western Ukraine.  Dniester River flows near the eastern edge of the village. Nyzhniv belongs to Tlumach urban hromada, one of the hromadas of Ukraine. In the village lived 1991 inhabitants in 2001.

Dniester Canyon begins near the village.

History 
Until 18 July 2020, Nyzhniv belonged to Tlumach Raion. The raion was abolished in July 2020 as part of the administrative reform of Ukraine, which reduced the number of raions of Ivano-Frankivsk Oblast to six. The area of Tlumach Raion was merged into Ivano-Frankivsk Raion.

People 
 Antin Levytsky, a Greek Catholic priest, who was Kost Levytsky's father. 
 Anastasia Stanko, a Ukrainian journalist and television hostess, a member of the "Stop censorship" movement.

References

Sources
 Dmytro Blazejowskyj, Historical Šematism of the Archeparchy of L'viv (1832-1944).— Kyiv: Publishing house «KM Akademia», 2004.— 570 p. 
 Niżniów w Słowniku geograficznym Królestwa Polskiego i innych krajów słowiańskich, Tom VII (Netrebka – Perepiat) z 1886 r., P. 169.

External links
 Towns&Cities: Nyzhniv also known as Niżniów, Nizhnov, Nizhnev, Nizhneve, Nizhnuv, Nizhnyuv

Villages in Ivano-Frankivsk Raion